CXL may refer to:

Science and technology
 Compute Express Link, a computer processor interface
 Corneal cross-linking, an eye surgery treatment
 CXL 1020, an experimental heart drug

Other uses
 140 (number), in Roman numerals
 Calexico International Airport (IATA and FAA LID codes), California, US